The 2003 Speedway World Cup Final was the fifth and last race of the 2003 Speedway World Cup season. It took place on August 9, 2003, in the Speedway Center in Vojens, Denmark.

Results

Heat details

References

See also 
 2003 Speedway World Cup
 motorcycle speedway

!